Annette Jensen (born 24 September 1991) is a Danish handball player for Team Esbjerg and the Danish national team.

She has also played for Fredericia HK, Horsens HK, Slagelse FH, Team Tvis Holstebro and Vipers Kristiansand in Norway.

She made her debut on the national team on 16 March 2017 against France.

Achievements
Danish Championship:
3rd Place: 2016
Women's EHF Cup Winners' Cup:
Winner: 2016

Individual awards
 Topscorer of Eliteserien 2013/2014 (145 goals)

References

1991 births
Living people
People from Fredericia
Danish female handball players
Sportspeople from the Region of Southern Denmark